The 2010–11 season saw FC Timișoara participate in Liga I, the Romanian Cup, and the UEFA Europa League.
 
In November 2010, a Romanian Court of Appeal returned the name, the colors and the record of AEK Politehnica Timișoara to FC Timișoara. Due to rules that forbid changes of team names during a season, the team used the name FC Timișoara until the end of 2010–11 season.

Team kit
The team kit is produced by Lotto and the shirt sponsor is Balkan Petroleum.

Previous season positions

Players

Squad information

Transfers

In

Out

Spending
Summer:   €0 million

Winter:   €0 million

Total:    €0 million

Income
Summer:   €600.000k

Winter:   €0 million

Total:    €600.000k

Squad stats

Goalscorers

Last updated:09:41, 3 June 2010 (UTC) 
Source: FCPT

Start formations

Starting 11

Overall
{|class="wikitable" style="text-align: center;"
|-
!
!Total
! Home
! Away
|-
|align=left| Games played || 35 || 17 ||18 
|-
|align=left| Games won    || 15 ||8 ||7 
|-
|align=left| Games drawn  || 16 ||8 ||8
|-
|align=left| Games lost   || 3 || 1 ||2
|-
|align=left| Biggest win  ||4–0 vs. U Craiova ||4-0 vs. U Craiova ||3–1 vs. Juventus București 
|-
|align=left| Biggest lose ||2–0 vs. Manchester City ||0-1 vs. Manchester City  || 2-0 vs. Manchester City
|-
|align=left| Clean sheets    ||8 ||4 ||4
|-
|align=left| Goals scored    ||58 ||31 ||27
|-
|align=left| Goals conceded  ||42 ||23 ||19
|-
|align=left| Goal difference ||+16 ||+8 ||+8
|-
|align=left| Top scorer   ||Zicu (18) ||11 ||7
|-

International appearances

Competitions

Overall

Liga I

League table

Results summary

Results by round

Results
Kick off times are in EET and EEST.

UEFA Europa League

Results

Cupa României

Results

Non-competitive matches

Goal scorers

Staff

Coaching staff

Notes and references

See also
FC Politehnica Timișoara
2011–12 FC Politehnica Timișoara season
2010–11 Liga I
2010–11 Cupa României

2010-11
Romanian football clubs 2010–11 season